I Got Dreams is the seventh studio album by American country music artist Steve Wariner. It was released in 1989 by MCA Records. The album includes "Where Did I Go Wrong", "I Got Dreams" and "When I Could Come Home to You". "Where Did I Go Wrong" and "I Got Dreams" were both Number One country hits for him, and "When I Could Come Home to You" peaked at #5.

Track listing

Personnel
As listed in liner notes.
George Grantham – background vocals
David Hungate – bass guitar
Carl Jackson – mandolin
John Barlow Jarvis – keyboards, piano solo on "The Flower That Shattered the Stone"
Bill LaBounty – background vocals
Allyn Love – steel guitar
Rick Marotta – drums
Mac McAnally – acoustic guitar, background vocals, percussion
Farrell Morris – percussion
Mark O'Connor – fiddle
Rick Stephenson - glockenspiel
Billy Joe Walker Jr. – acoustic guitar, electric guitar
Steve Wariner – lead vocals, background vocals, acoustic guitar, electric guitar
Terry Wariner – background vocals

Charts

Weekly charts

Year-end charts

References

1989 albums
MCA Records albums
Steve Wariner albums
Albums produced by Jimmy Bowen